The Downtown Independent is a one screen theater and cinema located at 251 S. Main Street in the Little Tokyo area of Los Angeles, California. It is operated by the Downtown Independent and owned by Orange County, California's Cinema Properties Group.

History
Prior to the Downtown Independent, the there was a theatre at this location as far back as 1924 when it opened as the Arrow Theatre. Before 1945 when it opened as the Linda Lea and was known as a showcase for Japanese cinema, it might have operated as a burlesque house. It was known as the Arrow and Aztec during its history with a shifting focus on differing content.  

Cinema Properties Group purchased the theatre in 2005, and following extensive renovation which uncovered more of the buildings history and incorporated some walls from the original theatre, it opened as the ImaginAsian Center in 2007 and was rebranded as the Downtown Independent in 2008. Its status following the Covid-19 pandemic closure is unknown.

References

External links
Official Site

Cinemas and movie theaters in Los Angeles
Little Tokyo, Los Angeles